Charlie Mulchrone (born 14 May 1989) is an English rugby union player currently playing for Harlequins in the Gallagher Premiership.

He was educated at St. Ambrose College. He first joined Rotherham Titans in the RFU Championship from Macclesfield RFC during the 2012-13 season. On 4 February 2014, he signed for Worcester Warriors from the 2014-15 season. On 5 April 2016, Mulchrone agrees a deal to join Premiership rivals Harlequins from the 2016-17 season.

On 3 November 2017, Charlie Mulchrone was named as vice-captain in the first fifteen to face Saracens in the Anglo Welsh Cup. With most of Harlequins first team regulars being rested.

References

External links
Harlequins Profile

1986 births
Living people
English rugby union players
Rotherham Titans players
Rugby union players from Manchester
Worcester Warriors players
People educated at St. Ambrose College
Rugby union scrum-halves